Vasil Petrov (born 5 October 1986) is a Bulgarian professional football manager and former player who played as a defender.

In 2007, at age of 17, Petrov started his own football academy, later registered as FC Sofia 2010 and in 2015 bought by Stoyne Manolov and transformed into Tsarsko Selo. In 2017, he started a new academy in Varna, called FC Varna 2017.

Academy ownership
In March 2007, under the initiative of his father Vladimir, Petrov established a football academy in Sofia. In 2010, after three consecutive years of growth, the academy formed a men's team and registered it with the Bulgarian Football Union under the name FC Sofia 2010. In the 2014–15 season, the team was playing in third league when it was bought by Stoyne Manolov. On 28 July 2016, the team was officially merged with Tsarsko Selo; the new team joined the Bulgarian Second Professional League.

In 2017, Petrov decided to start a new academy, but this time in Varna and called it FC Varna 2017.  In September 2022, FC Varna 2017 become a satellite of Spartak Varna academy, where Petrov become director month earlier.

Managerial career
In August 2020, Petrov was announced as the new manager of Spartak Varna in Bulgarian Third League. The team made а peremptory run, won the 2020–21 season and returned to the Second League. The team kept up the good performances under Petrov and ended the half season in first place. On 5 May 2022, after a 2:1 home win against Sozopol he secured a top 3 place and return to the First League for the 2022–23 season, after 12 years of absence for Spartak. His team ended up on 3rd place with having the same points with first and second team in group.  Petrov resigned as a manager on 11 August 2022, after his team scored just one point after the first 5 rounds in the First League. On 19 September 2022 he was announced as the new academy director of Spartak. Petrov become a manager of Spartak II on 26 October 2022.

Managerial statistics

Career honours

Head coach
Spartak Varna

Third League:
Champions (1): 2020–21

See also
 FC Sofia 2010

References

1986 births
Living people
Bulgarian footballers
FC Septemvri Sofia players
Association football defenders
Bulgarian football managers
PFC Spartak Varna managers
20th-century births